Madge Moulton (born 15 June 1917, date of death unknown) was a British diver. She competed in the women's 10 metre platform event at the 1936 Summer Olympics.

References

1917 births
Year of death missing
British female divers
Olympic divers of Great Britain
Divers at the 1936 Summer Olympics
Sportspeople from London